Emekeobibi is a village in southeastern Nigeria; it is located near the city of Owerri.

References

Towns in Imo State